Code Club AB is a Swedish video game developer based in Motala. The company was founded by Rolf Jansson and Markus Persson in 2007, and was formerly known as Mojang Specifications AB and Onetoofree AB. Code Club developed Wurm Online, a massively multiplayer online sandbox game, and its successor, Wurm Unlimited.

History 
Code Club AB was founded as Mojang Specifications AB by Swedish video game designers Rolf Jansson and Markus Persson in 2007, as their game, Wurm Online, began to turn a profit. Later in 2007, Markus Persson stepped out of the project and left the company. However, he wished to retain the "Mojang" name for himself, leading Jansson to rename the company Onetoofree AB. Jansson had issues explaining the name to others without having to spell it out, wherefore the company assumed a new name, Code Club AB, on 12 October 2011.

Games developed

References

External links 
 

Video game companies established in 2007
Swedish companies established in 2007
Video game companies of Sweden
Markus Persson